Le Château Inc. was a fashion company, currently under liquidation, that was founded in 1959 in Montreal, Quebec, Canada and designed, imported and retailed women's and men's apparel, accessories and footwear. In 2015, the company generated sales of about  million. The company sold directly to customers from 211 retail stores in Canada, as well as five that had been in the United Arab Emirates and Saudi Arabia. In 2017, Le Château had employed more than 2,500 people worldwide. Le Château manufactured about 35% of the merchandise itself in Canadian factories with the remainder imported. On October 23, 2020, it was announced that Le Château would be filing for CCAA bankruptcy protection, liquidating its inventory and closing all 123 stores.

In 2021, Le Cheateau would be bought out by Montreal-based Suzy Shier.

History

Early years: 1959-1982
Founded by Herschel Segal in 1959, as "Le Chateau Men's Wear", it began as a menswear store in downtown Montreal Victoria Square. Segal gave his store a French name because of the budding francophone feelings occurring in Quebec. At first, Le Château was not a "fashion-forward" store, as it would later become, as Segal sold overstock from his father's old store. In 2003, Segal described his early customers as "old ... blue-haired ladies." Le Château did well at first, and three more stores were opened. However, by the early 1960s the company was close to bankruptcy, and all but the original store were closed.

In 1962, Le Château added women's clothing, shortened the name to "Le Château", and switched to selling imported European fashions. The store imported from Carnaby Street in London, a fashion centre at the time, as well as other imports such as French suits and Italian turtlenecks. This worked well, and within a few years, Le Château completely phased out the original traditional clothing style to concentrate on selling fashionable imports to youths. Segal claims that Le Château was the first to introduce bell bottoms to Canada, and had the latest European fashion before it even arrived in New York. Le Château played an integral yet little known role in John Lennon and Yoko Ono's 1969 Montreal bed-in, providing the signature velour jumpsuits worn by the pair. By 1972, the chain grew to 10 stores, and by the end of the decade Le Château had over 50 stores across Canada.  By this time, Le Château had shifted to selling mainstream fashion instead of the latest imports from Europe.

IPO and expansion: 1983-2003
In December 1983, Le Château had its initial public offering on the Toronto Stock Exchange (TSX). It raised $7.3 million. By the early 1990s, Le Château had 160 stores and had switched to doing most of its design and manufacturing itself. In the early 1990s, there was a prolonged recession in Canada which hurt most business in the clothing industry.

In the mid 90s Le Château experimented briefly with Goth styled clothing and in 1997, it launched a short lived adolescent girls brand "Jr. Girls."

By 1999, the company's stock fell to an eight-year low. This led to a management shakeup, store redesign, changes to the merchandise, and according to Le Château, a concerted effort to improve its quality and image.

Restructuring: 2003-2011

In 2003, Segal acknowledged the "disposable fashion" stereotype, and said the company "forgot about" the product. "We might have been sloppy," he said. "But now we're putting in more money and time. We have an inspection system and a young lady who's a grad of a textile school. We never had that before." Since then, Le Château has been trying to build up its brand image, and shed the image that its clothes are "only for wearing to nightclubs," a view that still persists. That year, it released a collection based on the 1960s-set Renée Zellweger movie, Down with Love and was the exclusive supplier of clothing to Canadian Idol contestants.

Rebranding: 2012-2019
With many US retailers expanding into Canada, including competitor Express, and fast fashion stores such as H&M and Zara gaining market share, Le Château relaunched their brand in 2012. The company went from apparel for young shoppers to "new concept" stores carrying better quality, grown-up clothes at various price points. The rebranding was complete with a new logo and new white, sterile, more upscale stores, with nickel fixtures and glass shelving. Known for their tailored and form-fitting clothes, it sells formal wear, casual wear, evening wear, and footwear. Le Chateau now has over 240 stores in Canada.  While Le Château is publicly traded, the company is tightly held with 67% of shares owned by Silverstone, the company's board, executives and two institutional investors. In addition, the shares have less than 2% of voting rights. The current CEO is Segal's wife, Jane Segal.

To further the new company direction, Le Château clothes were featured in the Canadian film, After the Ball, featuring stars such as Chris Noth, Portia Doubleday and Lauren Holly.The movie was released across Canada in early 2015. Le Chateau used this opportunity to launch a clothing line named Lauren's Closet, a fashion line inspired by Lauren Holly.

In 2017, Le Château delisted from the Toronto Stock Exchange, and relisted on the TSX Venture Exchange, because it no longer met the Toronto Stock Exchange's listing requirements.  The company has recently experienced significant financial trouble, with losses of $35 million a year from 2014 to 2016, and has been forced to borrow from founder Herschel Segal.

CCAA bankruptcy filing and closure: 2020 & 2021
In July 2020, after several months of declining business, and hindered further by the COVID-19 pandemic in Canada, Le Château stated there is "significant doubt" it will survive another year.

In October 2020, Le Château announced the of closing all 123 stores across Canada. Stores remained in operation during its liquidation process, however about 1,400 jobs were lost when the chain ceased operation.

April 18, 2021, marked the end of the online store permanently.

Its remaining assets were sold in June 2021 to Suzy's Inc.

Dress For Success non-profit
In 2014, Le Château launched a partnership with "Dress For Success", a non-profit corporation to help economically disadvantaged women by providing them with interview attire. Le Château has committed over 1.4 million dollars  of clothing to the program. Le Château is further collaborating to the cause, through partnerships with stars such as Lauren Holly, having her promote Dress For Success to her fans.

Notes

References
Evans, Mark, "Clothing Sector in Tatters," Financial Post, August 15, 1992, p. 6.
Giese, Rachel, "Consuming Passion," This Magazine, November–December 2002, p. 23.
Kletter, Melanie, "Le Chateau's American Dream," WWD, November 2, 2000, p. 8B.
"More 34th Street Changes," WWD, March 13, 1997, p. 30.
Olijnyk, Zena, "Retail Sector Shudders in Eaton's Shock Wave," Financial Post, March 1, 1997, p. 4.
Vogl, Cara, "Quitting the Club," Marketing Magazine, September 29, 2003, p. 16.
Leckner, Ruck, "Le Chateau Launches Dress for Success Program,"'' Le Chateau, October 30, 2014, p. 1.

Clothing retailers of Canada
Clothing brands
Companies that have filed for bankruptcy in Canada
Clothing companies established in 1959
Retail companies established in 1959
Retail companies disestablished in 2021
Companies based in Montreal
Saint-Laurent, Quebec
1959 establishments in Quebec
2021 disestablishments in Quebec
Companies formerly listed on the Toronto Stock Exchange
Companies formerly listed on the TSX Venture Exchange
Companies disestablished due to the COVID-19 pandemic
1980s initial public offerings